The Derby de Lisboa or Dérbi de Lisboa (English: Lisbon derby) is a football derby match in Portugal. It is played between Lisbon clubs Benfica and Sporting CP, two of the most decorated clubs in Portugal. The rivalry originated in 1907 when eight Benfica players moved to Sporting before the first derby. The match is followed worldwide, especially among the Portuguese diaspora and in the former Portuguese colonies.

Honours comparison
These are the major football honours of Benfica and Sporting.

Championship of Lisbon

Head-to-head results

League matches
The matches listed below are only Primeira Liga matches, club name in bold indicates win. The score is given at full-time, and in the goals columns, the goalscorer and time when goal was scored is noted.

Head-to-head results

Portuguese Cup matches
The matches listed below are only Taça de Portugal matches, club name in bold indicates win. The score is given at full-time; in the goals columns, the goalscorer and time when goal was scored is noted.

Head-to-head results

League Cup matches
The matches listed below are only Taça da Liga matches; club name in bold indicates win. The score is given at full-time; in the goals columns, the goalscorer and time when goal was scored is noted.

Head-to-head results

Super Cup matches
The matches listed below are only Supertaça Cândido de Oliveira matches; club name in bold indicates win. The score is given at full-time; in the goals columns, the goalscorer and time when goal was scored is noted.

Head-to-head results

Championship of Portugal matches

Head-to-head results

Reserve team matches
Benfica B and Sporting B were established in the late 90s. They folded following the end of the 2005–06 season and were re-established in 2012 to compete starting from the 2012–13 Segunda Liga.

In 2018, Sporting B were again extinct after their relegation in the 2017–18 LigaPro.

Head-to-head results

All-time head-to-head results
This section does not include exhibition matches and results between reserve teams.

Records and statistics

Benfica

 Benfica's biggest home win: Benfica 7–2 Sporting (28 April 1948)
 Benfica 5–0 Sporting (3 December 1939)
 Benfica 5–0 Sporting (19 November 1978)
 Benfica 5–0 Sporting (12 March 1986)
 Benfica's biggest away win: Sporting 0–4 Benfica (27 February 1910)
 Benfica's most consecutive wins: 8 (25 October 1908 – 10 March 1912)
 Benfica's longest undefeated run: 14 (25 October 1908 – 17 January 1915)
 Benfica's most consecutive losses: 5 (5 October 1952 – 23 May 1954)
 Benfica's most consecutive matches without winning: 5 (29 November 1980 – 2 January 1983)

Sporting
 Sporting's biggest home win: Sporting 7–1 (14 December 1986)
 Sporting's biggest away win: Benfica 0–5 Sporting (18 October 1936)
 Benfica 0–5 Sporting (14 December 1941)
 Sporting's most consecutive wins: 5 (5 October 1952 – 23 May 1954)
 Sporting's longest undefeated run: 5 (29 November 1980 – 2 January 1983)
 Sporting's most consecutive losses: 8 (25 October 1908 – 10 March 1912)
 Sporting's most consecutive matches without winning: 14 (25 October 1908 – 17 January 1915)

Top goalscorers

Players who played for both clubs

  Artur José Pereira: Benfica 1907–14; Sporting 1914–19
  Alfredo Valadas: Sporting 1931–33; Benfica 1934–44
  Joaquim Alcobia: Sporting 1935–36; Benfica 1936–44
  António Martins: Sporting 1936–38; Benfica 1938–45
  Mário Galvão: Sporting 1935–40; Benfica 1941–43
  António Lourenço: Benfica 1949–51; Sporting 1953–56
  Zé Rita: Sporting 1952–55; Benfica 1962–65
  Mascarenhas: Benfica 1958–59; Sporting 1962–64
  José Barroca: Benfica 1959–63; Sporting 1963–70
  José Ferreira Pinto: Sporting 1958–62; Benfica 1965–68
  José Pérides: Sporting 1956–60, 1961–64; Benfica 1964–66
  Pedras: Benfica 1962–66; Sporting 1968–71
  Nélson Fernandes: Benfica 1965–68; Sporting 1969–76
  Rui Jordão: Benfica 1971–76; Sporting 1977–87
  Carlos Alhinho: Sporting 1972–75; Benfica 1976–77, 1978–81
  Artur Correia: Benfica 1971–77; Sporting 1977–79, 1979–80
  António Botelho: Sporting 1970–74, 1977–79; Benfica 1979–82
  António Fidalgo: Benfica 1970–73, 1975–76, 1977–79; Sporting 1979–83
  João Laranjeira: Sporting 1970–79; Benfica 1979–82
  Eurico Gomes: Benfica 1975–79; Sporting 1979–82
  Romeu Silva: Benfica 1975–77; Sporting 1983–86
  Carlos Manuel: Benfica 1979–87; Sporting 1988–90
  Fernando Mendes: Sporting 1985–89; Benfica 1989–91, 1992–93
  Paulo Futre: Sporting 1983–84; Benfica 1993
  António Pacheco: Benfica 1987–93; Sporting 1993–95
  Paulo Sousa: Benfica 1989–93; Sporting 1993–94
  Amaral: Sporting 1988–94; Benfica 1994–95
  Marinho: Sporting 1989–95; Benfica 1995–97
  José Dominguez: Benfica 1992–94; Sporting 1995–97
  Hugo Porfírio: Sporting 1992–97; Benfica 1998–2000, 2001–04
  Jorge Cadete: Sporting 1987–95; Benfica 1999–2003
  João Pinto: Benfica 1992–2000; Sporting 2000–04
  Dimas Teixeira: Benfica 1994–96; Sporting 2000–02
  Paulo Bento: Benfica 1994–96; Sporting 2000–04
  Dani: Sporting 1995–97; Benfica 2000
  Bruno Caires: Benfica 1994–97; 2000–04
  Rui Bento: Benfica 1991–92; Sporting 2001–04
  Marco Caneira: Sporting 1996–2000, 2006–07 (loan), 2008–11; Benfica 2001–02 (loan)
  Simão Sabrosa: Sporting 1997–99; Benfica 2001–07
  Emílio Peixe: Sporting 1991–95, 1996–97; Benfica 2002–03
  Derlei: Benfica 2007 (loan); Sporting 2007–09
  Carlos Martins: Sporting 2000–07; Benfica 2008–14
  Maniche: Benfica 1995–96, 1999–2002; Sporting 2010–11
  João Pereira: Benfica 2003–06; Sporting 2010–12, 2015–16, 2021
  Yannick Djaló: Sporting 2005–11; Benfica 2012–16
  Bruno César: Benfica 2011–13; Sporting 2015–18
  André Carrillo: Sporting 2011–16; Benfica 2016–19
  Lazar Marković: Benfica 2013–14; Sporting 2016–17 (loan)
  Fábio Coentrão: Benfica 2007–11; Sporting 2017–18 (loan)
  Nuno Santos: Benfica 2015–17; Sporting 2020–present
  João Mário: Sporting 2011–16, 2020–21 (loan); Benfica 2021–present

Coaches who managed both clubs

  Arthur John: Benfica 1929–31; Sporting 1931–33
  Otto Glória: Benfica 1954–59, 1968–1970; Sporting 1961, 1965–66
  Fernando Caiado: Benfica 1962; Sporting 1967–69
  Fernando Riera: Benfica 1962–63, 1966–68; Sporting 1974–75
  Jimmy Hagan: Benfica 1970–73; Sporting 1976–77
  Milorad Pavić: Benfica 1974–75; Sporting 1978–79
  Manuel José: Sporting 1985–86, 1990; Benfica 1997
  Fernando Santos: Sporting 2003–04; Benfica 2006–07
  Jesualdo Ferreira: Benfica 2002; Sporting 2013
  Jorge Jesus: Benfica 2009–15, 2020–21; Sporting 2015–18

Women's matches 
The first women's official derby was played on 19 October 2019 for matchday 3 of the 2019–20 National Championship. Benfica beat Sporting 3–0 at the Estádio da Luz, and the overall attendance record for a women's match in Portugal was surpassed with 12,812 spectators in the stands. The current attendance record – 15,032 spectators – was set on 21 January 2023.

Head-to-head results

National championship

Portuguese Cup

League Cup

All-time head-to-head results

Notes

References

Further reading

External links
 Benfica official website 
 Sporting official website 

Football rivalries in Portugal
S.L. Benfica
Sporting CP